James Peter Albery  (born 2 October 1995) is an English field hockey player who plays as a defender or midfielder for Old Georgians and the England and Great Britain national teams.
He attended The Leys School, Cambridge. In Upper Sixth he was Head Boy.

Club career
He plays club hockey in the Men's England Hockey League Premier Division for Old Georgians. 
 
Albery has also played for Cambridge City and Beeston.

International career
Albery made his senior England debut on 2 March 2017 against South Africa, in Cape Town, South Africa.

References

External links

Profile on England Hockey

1995 births
Living people
English male field hockey players
Place of birth missing (living people)
Beeston Hockey Club players
Men's England Hockey League players
2023 Men's FIH Hockey World Cup players
Commonwealth Games bronze medallists for England
Commonwealth Games medallists in field hockey
Field hockey players at the 2022 Commonwealth Games
Medallists at the 2022 Commonwealth Games